The 1955 Florida Gators football team represented the University of Florida during the 1955 college football season. The season was Bob Woodruff's sixth as the head coach of the Florida Gators football team. The Gators played their only eight-game Southeastern Conference schedule before the 1990s, and probably the most difficult of the 1950s. The standout Gator players included offensive and defensive tackle John Barrow, halfback and punter Don Chandler, two-way halfback Jackie Simpson and defensive back John Symank. The highlights of the 1955 season included three conference victories over the Mississippi State Maroons (20–14), LSU Tigers (18–14), and Georgia Bulldogs (19–13). The Gators closed out the season with a knife's edge 7–6 road loss to the Miami Hurricanes in their home stadium in Miami, Florida. Woodruff's 1955 Florida Gators finished 4–6 overall and 3–5 in the SEC, placing tenth of twelve teams in the conference.

Schedule

References

Florida
Florida Gators football seasons
Florida Gators football